Derek Frey (born April 23, 1973) is an American film producer and director who is the current head of Tim Burton Productions and Lazer Film Productions. He has been a producer on numerous Tim Burton-directed films including Miss Peregrine's Home for Peculiar Children, Frankenweenie, Big Eyes, Alice in Wonderland, Dumbo, and others.

Early life and education

Frey was born on April 23, 1973 in the Drexel Hill section of Upper Darby, Pennsylvania near Philadelphia. He graduating from Upper Darby High School. Frey attended West Chester University and graduated with a BA in communication studies.

Career

Frey began his career in the film industry in 1996 as an assistant for Tim Burton and an employee of Tim Burton Productions. He worked as Burton's assistant on Mars Attacks!, Sleepy Hollow, Planet of the Apes, and Big Fish. In 2001, he became the head of Tim Burton Productions. He would go on to earn producer credits in a variety of Tim Burton films including Alice in Wonderland, Big Eyes, Frankenweenie, Miss Peregrine's Home for Peculiar Children, Corpse Bride, and Sweeney Todd.

Frey also directs and produces under the banner, Lazer Film Productions. The company largely produces short films and music videos. His 2016 short film, Green Lake, was shown at over 40 film festivals at which it earned 47 awards including "Best Horror" at the Los Angeles Independent Film Festival Awards. Other short films produced and directed by Frey include Kill the Engine, Motel Providence, Sky Blue Collar, The Day the Dolls Struck Back, The Ballad of Sandeep (starring actor, Deep Roy), and numerous others. Frey produced Burton's live-action adaptation of Dumbo, which was released in March 2019.

Filmography

Feature films

Short films

References

External links
Official website

Living people
1973 births
People from Drexel Hill, Pennsylvania
Film producers from Pennsylvania
West Chester University alumni
Film directors from Pennsylvania